East Tyrone was a constituency of the Parliament of Northern Ireland.

Boundaries
East Tyrone was a county constituency comprising the eastern part of County Tyrone. It was created in 1929, when the House of Commons (Method of Voting and Redistribution of Seats) Act (Northern Ireland) 1929 introduced first-past-the-post elections throughout Northern Ireland. East Tyrone was created by the division of Fermanagh and Tyrone into eight new constituencies, of which five were in County Tyrone. The constituency survived unchanged, returning one member of Parliament, until the Parliament of Northern Ireland was temporarily suspended in 1972, and then formally abolished in 1973.

The main town in the area was Cookstown. The seat was bordered by Mid Tyrone to the west, South Tyrone to the south, South Londonderry to the north and Lough Neagh to the east.

Politics 
County Tyrone had five Stormont MPs between 1929 and 1972. Mid Tyrone and West Tyrone were strongly nationalist, while the constituencies covering the north and south of the county were consistently won by unionists. East Tyrone was marginal between the two traditions, with nationalists just outnumbering unionists.

Nationalists consistently won the seat, with majorities around 1,000.  In the 1958 election, however, the sitting Nationalist MP, Joseph Francis Stewart, was run close by the area's Westminster MP George Forrest (Ulster Unionist MP for Mid Ulster 1956–1969).

Members of Parliament

Election results 
At the 1929, 1933 general elections, Joseph Francis Stewart was elected unopposed.

At the 1945 election J F Stewart was elected unopposed.

At the 1953 election, Joseph Francis Stewart was elected unopposed.

Stewart died on 6 May 1964.

At the 1965 election, Austin Currie was elected unopposed.

The Northern Ireland Parliament was prorogued in 1972 and formally abolished in 1973.

References

Northern Ireland Parliament constituencies established in 1929
Constituencies of the Northern Ireland Parliament
Historic constituencies in County Tyrone
Northern Ireland Parliament constituencies disestablished in 1973